An election to the  was held on . Baku was the last major city in Russia to hold local duma elections during 1917. Notably, the vote was held after October Revolution commenced.

On 28 April 1915 the Baku City Duma decided to postpone elections for a new duma until the end of the war. The decision was ratified on 16 January 1916. However, with the overthrow of the czarist rule during the 1917 February Revolution, the issue of local elections re-emerged. Under the Provisional Government regulations were issued for  the holding of elections of city dumas on the basis of universal, equal and direct suffrage with secret ballot.

The Socialist-Revolutionaries and Mensheviks formed a strong alliance after July 1917, around the principle of 'revolutionary defencism' and set up a joint list for the city duma election. The Armenian Revolutionary Federation ('Dashnaks') was excluded from alliance.

However, the holding of the city duma election in Baku suffered long delays. In September 1917, OZAKOM ceded to demands for immediate elections to city duma. However, the city boundaries had remained unchanged, thus leaving the industrial districts outside of the city proper. The issue of incorporation of the Baku oilfields into the city proper was a key dispute in the run-up to the election. The incumbent city government, Moslem parties and the Kadets opposed incorporation, with the Moslem parties arguing that the oil fields had closer connection with the surrounding villages. The Baku Soviet called for incorporation, and the Bolsheviks actively campaigned for oil field incorporation.

Election result
Below an account published in the newspaper Kaspii on 1 November 1917;

The following, slightly different account, is present by Rosenberg (1969);

Rosenberg (1969) uses two sources for the Baku City Duma election result, the newspaper Baku (1 November 1917 issue) and Revolyutsiya 1917 goda v Azerbaydzhane: khronika sobytiy (Baku, 1927). He notes slight discrepancies between the results presented by the two sources. Notably the 1 December 1917 issue of Kaspii presented an account of the electoral result similar to that of Rosenberg.

Ethnicity of elected deputies

Formation of coalition government
After the election, the various political parties diverged on how to form a government for the city. The Mensheviks called for a government including all revolutionary and democratic forces. The Socialist-Revolutionaries argued in favour of a coalition between the city duma and the Baku soviet. The Armenian Revolutionary Federation, Musavat and Ittihad envisioned a coalition of city duma, Baku soviet, national councils and other democratic organizations. The Kadets, Yedinstvo and the incumbent city board argued for exclusive authority of the city duma. A meeting was held on 15 December 1917, and after a first divided vote and a series of negotiations, the Mensheviks moved to support a resolution for the formation of a coalition of the city duma, Baku soviet, Peasants Union, national councils and others. The broad coalition proposal received 47 votes whilst the proposal for a duma-soviet coalition received 24 votes. The coalition government was formed with the support of all parties except the Bolsheviks. The coalition government had 9 members - 3 from soviets (workers, peasants, soldiers), 3 from national organizations (Moslem, Armenian, Russian) and 3 from the city duma and its board.

References

Baku City Duma election
Local elections in Russia
Russian Revolution
20th century in Baku